Zarumilla is one of the three provinces of the Tumbes Region in northwestern Peru. It borders the Pacific Ocean on the north, Ecuador on the south and east, and the Tumbes Province on the west. 

Its capital is the town of Zarumilla. Other important settlements in the province include Matapalo and the border town of Aguas Verdes, which is connected to Ecuador by a bridge.

Zarumilla was established as a province on November 17, 1942.

The Zarumilla River, located in the eastern part of the province, marks the border between Peru and Ecuador. In 1998, during El Niño, the river changed its course, moving  of land into its eastern margin. Ecuadorians took advantage of this situation, saying that the river is the natural border marker and therefore gives them rights in the affected area. The Peruvians argued that the area is sovereign Peruvian soil.

Boundaries
 North: Pacific Ocean and Ecuador
 East: Ecuador
 South: Ecuador and Tumbes Province
 West: Tumbes Province

Political division
The province is divided into four districts (singular: distrito):
Matapalo
Papayal
Zarumilla
Aguas Verdes

See also
 History of the Ecuadorian-Peruvian territorial dispute

References
 Peruvian Army official website - Relación Perú-Ecuador, Puntos de fricción

Provinces of the Tumbes Region